Celo Lifetu Selengue (born December 27, 1976 in Kinshasa) is a retired Congolese basketball player.  He is listed at 6’3” and 203 pounds.

He played for Interclube at the Angolan major basketball league BAI Basket from 2010 to 2013.

In January 2014, he signed a 1-year deal with Recreativo do Libolo.

In March 2014, on the course of the 2013–14 BAI Basket, Primeiro de Agosto filed a claim, accusing Selenge of playing for Recreativo do Libolo as an Angolan national. He was subsequently suspended and accused by the Angolan Basketball Federation of possession of a forged Angolan nationality, possibly facing criminal charges.

See also
DR Congo national basketball team

External links
2007 FIBA Africa Championship Stats

References

1976 births
Living people
Basketball players from Kinshasa
Democratic Republic of the Congo men's basketball players
Democratic Republic of the Congo expatriates in Angola
Centers (basketball)
Atlético Petróleos de Luanda basketball players
Atlético Sport Aviação basketball players
C.D. Primeiro de Agosto men's basketball players
C.R.D. Libolo basketball players
G.D. Interclube men's basketball players
21st-century Democratic Republic of the Congo people